Arab immigration to the Republic of Honduras began in the 19th century with the liberal reforms of President Marco Aurelio Soto (1876–1883), who saw immigration as a determining factor in the development of capitalism in Central America, and sought to establish an attractive environment for foreign investment. The largest Arab community in Honduras is the people of Palestinian descent, the majority of whom (65%) are Christian (Catholic and Orthodox). The approximate population of Honduran Arabs is more than 280,000 people, estimates place the Muslim population at about 5,000–6,000.

History

Background 
Relatively few Arabs immigrated to Honduras during the 19th century. Under conservative General Captain José María Medina (1862-1876), the National Congress issued the first immigration law on February 26, 1866, allowing willing foreigners to reside in the country. Afterwards, the liberal reformer Dr. Marco Aurelio Soto (1876-1883) published the Political Constitution of 1876, which reflected the importance he placed on immigration for national development, including those from North America (many displaced by the aftermath of the Civil War), Europe, the Middle East and Asia, etc. The government of General Luis Bográn (1883-1891) also emphasized immigration as a means to increase the national population, develop the labor force, further exploit the country's natural resources; in Honduras he offered foreigners the opportunity to treat with equality, a cordial welcome, security, and especially an influence on the Honduran national identity. Constantino Nini is cited as the first Arab to settle in Honduras in 1893, even before Christians were legally allowed to leave the Ottoman Empire in 1895.

20th century 
The early 20th century saw a major increase in Arab immigration to Honduras following crisis in the Ottoman Empire and World War I. In the early 20th century, Gonzalo "Chalo" Luque noted the names of many Palestinian-Arab heads-of-household in San Pedro Sula, and Mario Posas made a similar list for the developing banana plantations near La Ceiba. In 1920, Palestinian Arabs made up just 0.5% of the Honduran population according to documents from the Ministry of Foreign Relations, and the 1935 census showed just 47 "Turks" and 721 Palestinians out of a total population of 960,000. (Because many immigrants had passports from the Ottoman Empire, Arab Hondurans acquired the generic nickname of "Turcos".) However, several researchers suggest that there had been a wave of Middle Eastern immigrants to Central America in the 1920s and 1930s; hundreds of families settled primarily in Honduras, with nearly 25,000 Arabs in San Pedro Sula alone by 1930, and over 40,000 by 1940. Many of these immigrants were well-educated, and many came from Bethlehem or surrounding villages which allowed them to form cohesive and supportive social networks. Fluency in English allowed early coffee grinders to establish trade relationships with Belize and North America, and by the early 20th century, Arab families owned over 40% of local businesses according to one survey.

In 1939 the Tegucigalpa Arab community organized the "Society Union Arab Youth" under the leadership of Gabriel Kattán and Nicolás Larach, which led to the founding of similar associations in Cuba, El Salvador, Guatemala, Mexico and Nicaragua. This organization published a weekly newspaper, Rumbos ("Directions"), and produced an exclusive radio program for Radio HRN. In 1968, eight Arab-Honduran members of this Society purchased six acres in a suburb of San Pedro Sula where they built a swimming pool. This eventually grew into the US$15 million Arab-Honduran Social Center complex, which included some 1,600 families as club members by 2001.

Modern day 
Estimates placed the Palestinian Arab population at between 150,000 and 200,000 at the beginning of the 21st century, a percentage second only to Chile in the Americas.

Notable Arab-Hondurans 

Despite comprising only approximately three percent of the country's population, Arab Houndurans are major players in the country's economy, politics, arts, and sciences.

Business and politics 
 Victoria Asfura, politician and former President of the Central Bank of Honduras
 Miguel Facussé Barjum, founder and president of Corporación Dinant, chief economic advisor 1982-86
 Miguel Andonie Fernández, Ph.D., founder of the Innovation and Unity Party
 Carlos Roberto Flores, President of Honduras 1998-2002
 Juan Bendeck, businessman, politician, and minister
 Gabriel Kattan, Businessman, politician
 Elías Canahuati, founder of Canahuati Tobacco
 Óscar Kafati, president of El Indio Coffee Mills, former minister of Economic Development
 Juan Kawas, 1898 immigrant and leading importer of wines and spirits
 Salvador Nasrralla, first vice president of Honduras, TV host.

Cinema and television 

 Sami Kafati, film director
Fonsi Bendeck, film director
Michael Bendeck, film producer

Science 

 Roberto A. Dabdoub, Biologist
 Kerim Gattas Asfura, Chemist

See also 
 Immigration in Honduras
 Spanish migration to Honduras
History of the Jews in Honduras
Italian migration to Honduras
Honduras–Palestine relations
 American immigration to Honduras
 Islam in Honduras

Notes and references

Bibliography 
 
 Euraque, Dario A. (1996) State, Power, Nationality, and Race in the History of Honduras. Editiones Subirana, Tegucigalpa, Honduras.
 Olga Joya and Ricardo Urquía. 1983. State Interventions in the Economic Development of Tegucigalpa, Thesis, History Department UNAH
 Pastor Fasquelle, Rodolfo. Biography of San Pedro Sula, 1536-1954. Centro Editorial, San Pedro Sula, Honduras; 1990.

Ethnic groups in Honduras
Arab diaspora
Immigration to Honduras
History of Honduras